WAP or Wap may refer to:

Music
 "WAP" (song), a 2020 song by Cardi B featuring Megan Thee Stallion

Organizations
 Weatherization Assistance Program, for US energy costs
 Western Australia Party, a political party founded in 2016
 Western Australian Party, a short-lived political party in 1906
 Women Against Pornography, an American radical feminist activist group
 World Animal Protection, an international charity
 Wale Adenuga Production, media company in Nigeria
 WapTV, now Miniweb, interactive television technology platform company

Science and technology
 Weak anthropic principle, in astrophysics and cosmology
 Wireless access point, a device that allows wireless devices to connect to a wired network and to each other
 Wireless Application Protocol, a technical standard for accessing information over a mobile wireless network
 Wide AC electric passenger, a classification of Indian locomotives

Other uses
 Western Antarctic Peninsula, a region of the Antarctic Peninsula
 Onomatopoetic sound effect sometimes used for striking, or else in reference to intercourse, often in repetition